MY Camelopardalis (MY Cam) is a binary star system located in the Alicante 1 open cluster, some  away in the constellation Camelopardalis. It is one of the most massive known binary star systems and a leading candidate for a massive star merger. MY Cam is the brightest star in Alicante 1.

The system consists of two hot blue O-type stars with one component having a mass of 32 solar masses and the other 38 solar masses. Both stars share a common envelope.

References

Camelopardalis (constellation)

Common envelope binary stars
Eclipsing binaries
O-type main-sequence stars

Camelopardalis, MY
J03591829+5714137
Emission-line stars
Durchmusterung objects